Karl Kiesenebner (born 8 December 1950) is an Austrian football defender.

References

1950 births
Living people
Austrian footballers
LASK players
FC Wels players
Austrian Football Bundesliga players
Association football defenders
FC Blau-Weiß Linz managers